WAJR is a News/Talk/Sports formatted broadcast radio station licensed to Morgantown, West Virginia, serving North Central West Virginia.  WAJR is owned and operated by West Virginia Radio Corporation.

For decades, WAJR was the flagship station for West Virginia Mountaineers football and basketball. However, that role has since been taken on by WZST.

FM Translator
In addition to the main station at 1440 kHz, WAJR is relayed by an FM translator to widen its broadcast area, especially at night when the AM station reduces power to 500 watts.  Translator W283CR is owned by Morgantown, West Virginia-based West Virginia Radio Corporation.

References

External links
Full Service 1440 WAJR Online

1940 establishments in West Virginia
News and talk radio stations in the United States
Sports radio stations in the United States
Radio stations established in 1940
AJR